All Over Chile (Spanish: Por Todo Chile) was a Chilean political coalition that held one senator and one deputy in the LV legislative period of the Chilean Congress.

It brought together the Progressive Party and País for the 2017 Chilean general election.

References 
Defunct political party alliances in Chile
2017 establishments in Chile
Political parties established in 2017
Political parties disestablished in 2017
2017 disestablishments in Chile
Defunct left-wing political party alliances